Donald Arthur Glaser (September 21, 1926 – February 28, 2013) was an American physicist, neurobiologist, and the winner of the 1960 Nobel Prize in Physics for his invention of the bubble chamber used in subatomic particle physics.

Education
Born in Cleveland, Ohio, Glaser completed his Bachelor of Science degree in physics and mathematics from Case School of Applied Science in 1946. He completed his PhD in physics from the California Institute of Technology in 1949. Glaser accepted a position as an instructor at the University of Michigan in 1949, and was promoted to professor in 1957. He joined the faculty of the University of California at Berkeley, in 1959, as a Professor of Physics. During this time his research concerned short-lived elementary particles. The bubble chamber enabled him to observe the paths and lifetimes of the particles.

Starting in 1962, Glaser changed his field of research to molecular biology, starting with a project on ultraviolet-induced cancer. In 1964, he was given the additional title of Professor of Molecular Biology. Glaser's position (since 1989) was Professor of Physics and Neurobiology in the Graduate School.

Personal life
Donald Glaser was born on September 21, 1926, in Cleveland, Ohio, to Russian Jewish immigrants, Lena and William J. Glaser, a businessman. He enjoyed music and played the piano, violin, and viola. He went to Cleveland Heights High School, where he became interested in physics as a means to understand the physical world. He died in his sleep at the age of 86 on February 28, 2013, in Berkeley, California, survived by his wife, Lynn Glaser, his daughter, Louise Glaser, his son, William Glaser, and his grandchildren Emily and Katherine Schreiner and Caroline, Julia, Ava, and Max Glaser.

Education and early career
Glaser attended Case School of Applied Science (now Case Western Reserve University), where he completed his bachelor's degree in physics and mathematics in 1946. During the course of his education there, he became especially interested in particle physics. He played viola in the Cleveland Philharmonic while at Case, and taught mathematics classes at the college after graduation. He continued on to the California Institute of Technology (Caltech), where he pursued his PhD in physics. His interest in particle physics led him to work with Nobel laureate Carl David Anderson, studying cosmic rays with cloud chambers. He preferred the accessibility of cosmic ray research over that of nuclear physics. While at Caltech he learned to design and build the equipment he needed for his experiments, and this skill would prove to be useful throughout his career. He also attended molecular genetics seminars led by Nobel laureate Max Delbrück; he would return to this field later. 
Glaser completed his doctoral thesis, The Momentum Distribution of Charged Cosmic Ray Particles Near Sea Level, after starting as an instructor at the University of Michigan in 1949. He received his PhD from Caltech in 1950, and he was promoted to Professor at Michigan in 1957.

Bubble chamber

While teaching at Michigan, Glaser began to work on experiments that led to the creation of the bubble chamber. His experience with cloud chambers at Caltech had shown him that they were inadequate for studying elementary particles. In a cloud chamber, particles pass through gas and collide with metal plates that obscure the scientists' view of the event. The cloud chamber also needs time to reset between recording events and cannot keep up with accelerators' rate of particle production.

He experimented with using superheated liquid in a glass chamber. Charged particles would leave a track of bubbles as they passed through the liquid, and their tracks could be photographed. He created the first bubble chamber with ether. He experimented with hydrogen while visiting the University of Chicago, showing that hydrogen would also work in the chamber.

It has often been claimed that Glaser was inspired to his invention by the bubbles in a glass of beer; however,  in a 2006 talk, he refuted this story, saying that although beer was not the inspiration for the bubble chamber, he did experiments using beer to fill early prototypes.

His new invention was ideal for use with high-energy accelerators, so Glaser traveled to Brookhaven National Laboratory with some students to study elementary particles using the accelerator there. The images that he created with his bubble chamber brought recognition of the importance of his device, and he was able to get funding to continue experimenting with larger chambers. Glaser was then recruited by Nobel laureate Luis Alvarez, who was working on a hydrogen bubble chamber at the University of California at Berkeley. Glaser accepted an offer to become a Professor of Physics there in 1959.

Nobel Prize
Glaser was awarded the 1960 Nobel Prize for Physics for the invention of the bubble chamber. His invention allowed scientists to observe what happens to high-energy beams from an accelerator, thus paving the way for many important discoveries.

Other awards and honors
 Elliott Cresson Medal (1961)
Elected to the National Academy of Sciences (1962)
 Golden Plate Award of the American Academy of Achievement (1989)
Elected to the American Philosophical Society (1997)
Elected to the American Academy of Arts and Sciences (2003)

Transition to molecular biology
After winning the Nobel Prize, Glaser began to think about switching from physics into a new field. He wanted to concentrate on science, and found that as the experiments and equipment grew larger in scale and cost, he was doing more administrative work. He also anticipated that the ever-more-complex equipment would cause consolidation into fewer sites and would require more travel for physicists working in high-energy physics.
Recalling his interest in molecular genetics that began at Caltech, Glaser began to study biology. He spent a semester at MIT as a visiting professor and attended biology seminars there, and also spent a semester at Copenhagen with Ole Maaloe, the prominent Danish molecular biologist.

Glazer told his business colleagues at Cetus that after winning the Nobel prize he decided he had spent the first part of his life studying the physical world and that he now wanted to study the basis of life itself so he changed to studying biology and genetics.  He made the comment “As a physicist and highly trained engineer my immediate thought upon entering my first biology lab was that Louis Pasteur would be comfortable working there.” He then went on to develop equipment to automate various biological processes.  In fact, Cetus was originally formed to utilize his inventions and expertise with its first projects focused on producing higher yielding antibiotic strains as the company then evolved, pioneering the field of biotechnology.

He worked in UC Berkeley's Virus Lab (now the Biochemistry and Virus Laboratory), doing experiments with bacterial phages, bacteria, and mammalian cells. He studied the development of cancer cells, in particular the skin cancer xeroderma pigmentosum. As with the bubble chamber, he used his experience designing equipment to improve the experimental process. He automated the process of pouring out agar, spreading culture, and counting colonies of cells using a machine he called the dumbwaiter. It took photographs, administered chemicals, and had a mechanical hand to pick up colonies.

Commercial ventures
While continuing to work at UC Berkeley, Glaser started Berkeley Scientific Laboratory with Bill Wattenberg in 1968. The short-lived partnership worked on automating diagnostic procedures.

In 1971 he founded Cetus Corporation with Moshe Alafi, Ron Cape, and Peter Farley. Glaser's position was Chairman of the Science Advisory Board. The founders felt that the knowledge scientists had gained about DNA had not yet been applied to solve real problems. The company did microbial strain improvement, and then genetic engineering, becoming the first biotechnology company. Cetus was purchased by Chiron Corporation in 1991.

Transition to neurobiology
As molecular biology became more dependent on biochemistry, Glaser again considered a career change. His experience automating visual tasks in physics and molecular biology led him to an interest in human vision and how the brain processes what is seen. He began to work on computational modeling of the visual system and visual psychophysics, and spent a sabbatical at the Rowland Institute for Science.

References

External links

  including the Nobel Lecture, December 12, 1960 Elementary Particles and Bubble Chambers

1926 births
2013 deaths
Nobel laureates in Physics
American Nobel laureates
American neuroscientists
Jewish neuroscientists
Experimental physicists
Members of the United States National Academy of Sciences
California Institute of Technology alumni
Case Western Reserve University alumni
University of California, Berkeley College of Letters and Science faculty
University of Michigan faculty
American people of Russian-Jewish descent
Jews and Judaism in Cleveland
Jewish American physicists
Scientists from Cleveland
Scientists from California
Scientists from Michigan
20th-century American physicists
Fellows of the American Physical Society
Cleveland Heights High School alumni
Members of the American Philosophical Society
Time Person of the Year